Sylosis Live At High Voltage is Sylosis first live album that was released by High Voltage festival independently in 2011. It features the live set that the band played at the festival in its entirety.

Track listing

Personnel
Josh Middleton – lead vocals & lead guitar
Alex Bailey – rhythm guitar
Carl Parnell – bass guitar
Rob Callard – drums

References

2011 live albums
Sylosis albums